The 2019–20 season was Deportivo de La Coruña's 113th season in existence and the club's second consecutive season in the second division of Spanish football. In addition to the domestic league, Deportivo La Coruña participated in this season's edition of the Copa del Rey. The season was slated to cover a period from 1 July 2019 to 30 June 2020. It was extended extraordinarily beyond 30 June due to the COVID-19 pandemic in Spain. In the end, Deportivo got relegated to Segunda División B in spite of seven consecutive wins in the league at the end of the autumn. The bad start and finish to the season confirmed the relegation.

On the last matchday, the game against Fuenlabrada was suddenly postponed after it was found that a number of this club's players were infected with the coronavirus when the visiting team arrived in A Coruña. However, the other matches of the teams threatened with relegation took place as usual and ended with the victory of both Lugo and Albacete to avoid going down to the third division and relegating Deportivo without even playing their match. Deportivo then threatened not to play their final match if the other games were not replayed.

Players

Current squad

Out on loan

Pre-season and friendlies

Competitions

Overview

Segunda División

League table

Results summary

Results by round

Matches
The fixtures were revealed on 4 July 2019.

Copa del Rey

Statistics

Goalscorers

References

External links

Deportivo de La Coruña seasons
Deportivo de La Coruña